Crocodylinae is a subfamily of true crocodiles within the family Crocodylidae, and is the sister taxon to Osteolaeminae (dwarf crocodiles and slender-snouted crocodiles).

Taxonomy
Crocodylinae was cladistically defined by Christopher Brochu in 1999 as Crocodylus niloticus (the Nile crocodile) and all crocodylians more closely related to it than to Osteolaemus tetraspis (the Dwarf crocodile). This is a stem-based definition, and is the sister taxon to Osteolaeminae.

Crocodylinae contains the extant genus Crocodylus. It is disputed as to whether is also includes Mecistops (slender-snouted crocodiles), or the extinct genus Voay.

Phylogeny
Some morphological studies have recovered Mecistops as a basal member of Crocodylinae, more closely related to Crocodylus than to Osteolaemus and the other members of Osteolaeminae, as shown in the cladogram below.

The below cladogram is based on a 2021 study using paleogenomics that extracted DNA from the extinct Voay, recovering it as a member of Crocodylinae.

Species list

Crocodylinae contains 13-14 extant species and 6 extinct species.

Subfamily Crocodylinae
Genus Crocodylus
Crocodylus acutus, American crocodile
Crocodylus halli, Hall's New Guinea crocodile
Crocodylus intermedius, Orinoco crocodile
Crocodylus johnstoni, Freshwater crocodile, or Johnstone's crocodile
Crocodylus mindorensis, Philippine crocodile
Crocodylus moreletii, Morelet's crocodile or Mexican crocodile
Crocodylus niloticus, Nile crocodile
Crocodylus novaeguineae, New Guinea crocodile
Crocodylus palustris, mugger, marsh or Indian crocodile
Crocodylus porosus, Saltwater crocodile or Estuarine crocodile
Crocodylus raninus, Borneo crocodile, is currently considered to be a synonym of Crocodylus porosus; whether or not it is a distinct species remains unclear.
Crocodylus rhombifer, Cuban crocodile
Crocodylus siamensis, Siamese crocodile
Crocodylus suchus, West African crocodile, desert or sacred crocodile
Crocodylus anthropophagus
Crocodylus checchiai
Crocodylus falconensis
Crocodylus palaeindicus
Crocodylus thorbjarnarsoni
 Genus Voay
Voay robustus (formerly Crocodylus robustus)

References

Crocodylidae
Reptile subfamilies
Taxa named by Georges Cuvier